Andrew Bolton (born 1966) is a British museum curator and current head curator of the Anna Wintour Costume Center at the Metropolitan Museum of Art in New York City.

Early life and education
Bolton was born in 1966 in Blackburn, Lancashire and majored in anthropology at the University of East Anglia in Norwich, where he graduated in 1987.

Career
Bolton began his career at London's Victoria and Albert Museum.  

On September 8, 2015,  it was announced that he would replace the retiring Harold Koda as curator in chief of the Anna Wintour Costume Center. Later that year, he was awarded the Vilcek Prize in Fashion. Bolton has created and or co-created several critically lauded exhibitions including Savage Beauty featuring clothing created by British fashion designer Alexander McQueen, as well as China: Through the Looking Glass (both with Koda). Bolton exhibitions are known for their, "scholarly rigor....whimsy.... (and) theatricality."

Japanese fashion designer Rei Kawakubo was the subject of the 2017 exhibit. In an interview with Vogue in April 2017, Bolton stated: “I really think her influence is so huge, but sometimes it’s subtle. It’s not about copying her; it’s the purity of her vision.” Bolton also stated that the exhibition would be an austere, all-white maze hosting approximately 150 Comme ensembles. Both the exhibit and accompanying book by Bolton are based upon the recurrent fashion dichotomies concentrating on eight thematic oppositions listed as: (1) fashion/antifashion; (2) design/not design; (3) model/multiple; (4) then/now; (5) high/low; (6) self/other; (7) object/subject; and (8) clothes/not clothes.

Bolton's show, Heavenly Bodies: Fashion and the Catholic Imagination, opened on 10 May 2018. Bolton described the exhibition as an examination of "the role dress plays within the Roman Catholic Church and the role the Roman Catholic Church plays within the fashionable imagination." The exhibition included objects from the Vatican Collection alongside designs by Gianni Versace, John Galliano for Dior, Yves Saint Laurent and other designers.

Bolton is featured alongside Anna Wintour in Andrew Rossi's 2016 documentary film The First Monday in May, which documents the staging of the Metropolitan Museum's annual Costume Institute Gala.

Costume Institute Exhibitions 

 2006: AngloMania: Tradition and Transgression in British Fashion (May 3 – September 6, 2006)
 2007: Poiret: King of Fashion (May 9 – August 5, 2007)
 2008: Superheroes: Fashion and Fantasy (May 7 – September 1, 2008)
 2009: The Model As Muse: Embodying Fashion (May 6 – August 9, 2009)
 2010: American Woman: Fashioning a National Identity (May 5 – August 10, 2010)
 2011: Alexander McQueen: Savage Beauty (May 4 – August 7, 2011)
 2012: Schiaparelli and Prada: Impossible Conversations (May 10 – August 19, 2012)
 2013: Punk: Chaos to Couture (May 9 – August 14, 2013)
 2014: Charles James: Beyond Fashion (May 8 – August 10, 2014)
 2014–2015: Death Becomes Her: A Century of Mourning Attire (October 21, 2014 – February 1, 2015)
 2015: China: Through the Looking Glass• (May 7 – September 7, 2015)
 2015–2016: Jacqueline de Ribes: The Art of Style (November 19, 2015 – February 21, 2016)
 2016: Manus x Machina: Fashion In An Age Of Technology (May 5 – September 5, 2016)
 2016–2017: Masterworks: Unpacking Fashion (November 18, 2016 – February 5, 2017)
 2017: Rei Kawakubo/Comme des Garçons: Art of the In-Between (May 4 – September 4, 2017)
 2018: Heavenly Bodies: Fashion and the Catholic Imagination (May 10 – October 8, 2018)
 2019: Camp: Notes on Fashion (May 8 – September 9, 2019)
 2020: About Time: Fashion and Duration
 2021–2022 In America: A Lexicon of Fashion (Part one of a two part exhibition)
 2022 In America: An Anthology of Fashion (Part two of a two part exhibition)

Personal life
Since 2011, Bolton has lived in Manhattan with fashion designer Thom Browne, his partner.

Literary works 

The following is an incomplete list of his literary works:

 Bolton, Andrew (2002). The Supermodern Wardrobe. New York: V&A.
 Bolton, Andrew (November 2, 2010). Sui, Anna; White, Jack; Meisel, Steven, eds. Anna Sui. New York: Chronicle Books. .
 Bolton, Andrew (2011). McQueen, Alexander, eds. Alexander McQueen: Savage Beauty. New York: Metropolitan Museum of Art. .
 Bolton, Andrew (and Richard Hell, Jon Savage, John Lydon) (2013), eds. Punk: Chaos to Couture. New York: Metropolitan Museum of Art.
Bolton, Andrew (2016). Manux X Machina: Fashion in an Age of Technology. New York: Metropolitan Museum of Art. 
Bolton, Andrew (2017). Rei Kawakubo/Comme des Garçons: Art of the In-Between. New York: Metropolitan Museum of Art. 
Bolton, Andrew (2018). Heavenly Bodies: Fashion and the Catholic Imagination. New York: Metropolitan Museum of Art.
Bolton, Andrew (2019). In Pursuit of Fashion: The Sandy Schreier Collection. New York: Metropolitan Museum of Art.

References

Living people
Alumni of the University of East Anglia
English curators
People associated with the Metropolitan Museum of Art
1966 births